Shanghai Lalas: Female Tongzhi Communities and Politics in Urban China is a 2012 book written by Lucetta Kam Yip-lo and published by the Hong Kong University Press. It is Volume 1 of the Queer Asia series.

The book discusses lalas, including female bisexuals, lesbians, and trans women, in Shanghai. From 2005 to 2011, as part of her research, Lucetta Kam interviewed 25 lalas. Most of the women were in their 20s and originated from urban areas.

Shanghai-born Lucetta Kam is an assistant professor at Hong Kong Baptist University (HKBU), and she is involved in LGBT organizations in Hong Kong, where she was raised. Lucetta Kam herself is a lesbian, and Joanna Chiu of the South China Morning Post wrote that Lucetta Kam "needed to work to maintain her distance from her subjects".

Reception
Joanna Chiu wrote that the book was "a balanced, richly insightful and succinctly argued study" that "reveals as many truths about the lives of urban lalas as about the shifting forms of social control - and strategies of social transformation - in Chinese society today."

See also
 LGBT culture in Shanghai

References

Further reading
 Lau, Sin Wen. "Shanghai Lalas: Female Tongzhi Communities and Politics in Urban China" (Book Review). The China Journal, 2014, Vol.71(1), pp. 251–253 [Peer Reviewed Journal]
 Liu, Petrus. "Historicizing Queer Stories from Asia." Cross-Currents: East Asian History and Culture Review, 2014, Vol.3(3), pp. 259–262.
 Intersections: Gender and Sexuality in Asia and the Pacific, Issue 33, December 2013.

External links
 Shanghai Lalas: Female Tongzhi Communities and Politics in Urban China - HKU Press

2012 non-fiction books
Books about Shanghai
Lesbian culture in Asia
LGBT in China
LGBT rights in China
2010s LGBT literature
Hong Kong University Press books